The Walter NZ 40 was an unsuccessful, three-cylinder, air-cooled, radial engine for aircraft use built in Czechoslovakia by Walter Aircraft Engines in the late-1920s.

Design and development
Using common cylinders and parts from the earlier Walter NZ 60 (Novák-Zeithammer) engine the NZ 40 was the last in this series of engines. Problems with imbalance causing vibrations lead to the type being redesigned as the NZ 45. This version underwent a type test in early 1932 but the problems were not fully resolved and the engine did not find any aircraft application. Very few of these engines were produced before being replaced in the range by the Walter Polaris.

Specifications (NZ 40)

See also

References

 Gunston, Bill. World Encyclopaedia of Aero Engines. Cambridge, England. Patrick Stephens Limited, 1989. 
 Němeček, Václav. Československá letadla I (1918-1945) (Czechoslovak Aircraft I (1918-1945)). Third edition, Naše vojsko, Prague. 1983.

NZ 40
1920s aircraft piston engines
Aircraft air-cooled radial piston engines